Webu Sayadaw (17 February 1896 – 26 June 1977) was a Theravada Buddhist monk, and vipassanā master, best known for giving all importance to diligent practice, rather than scholastic achievement.

Early life
Ven. Webu Sayadaw was born to Daw Kyin Nu and U Lu Pe in 1896 in British Burma near Khin U township in modern-day Sagaing Division. He underwent the usual monk's training in the Pāli scriptures from the age of nine, when he became a novice, until he was twenty-seven.

Monk and teacher
In 1923 (seven years after his ordination), he left the monastery and spent four years in solitude. He practiced (and later taught) the technique of Ānāpānasati (awareness of the in-breath and out-breath). He said that by working with this practice to a very deep level of concentration, one is able to develop Vipassanā (insight) into the essential characteristics of all experience: anicca (impermanence), anatta (egolessness) and dukkha (unsatisfactoriness). According to Roger Bischof, on return from his four years of seclusion, he said, regarding Ānāpānasati: "This is a shortcut to Nibbana, anyone can use it. It stands up to investigation and is in accordance with the teachings of the Buddha as conserved in the scriptures. It is the straight path to Nibbana." Ven. Webu Sayadaw was famous for his unflagging diligence in meditation and for spending most of his time in solitude. He was reputed to be an arahant (fully enlightened one), and it is said that he never slept.

For the first fifty-seven years of his life, Ven. Webu Sayadaw stayed in upper Burma, dividing his time among three meditation centres in a small area. After his first trip to Rangoon in 1953 to visit the International Meditation Centre at the invitation of Sayagyi U Ba Khin, he included southern Burma in his travels, visiting there to teach and meditate from time to time. He also went on pilgrimage to India and Sri Lanka. Ven. Webu Sayadaw spent his final days at the meditation centre in the village where he was born. He died on 26 June 1977, at the age of eighty-one.

See also
Sayagyi U Ba Khin
International Meditation Centre

References
Biography of Venerable Webu Sayadaw

Wheel Publications (BPS)
Essential Practice Part I: Dhamma Discourses of the Venerable Webu Sayadaw (WH375/376)
Essential Practice Part II: Dhamma Discourses of the Venerable Webu Sayadaw (WH384/385)

Bodhi Leaf Publications (BPS)
Dhamma Talk-1 (BL119)
To Light A Fire (BL122)

External links
Video and rare photos of Venerable Webu Sayadaw
The Way to Ultimate Calm: Selected Discourses of Webu Sayadaw (full book)
Short biography

Theravada Buddhist monks
1896 births
1977 deaths
Burmese Theravada Buddhists
Burmese Buddhist monks
People from Sagaing Region
20th-century Buddhist monks